The 2012 Winchester Council election took place on 3 May 2012 to elect members of Winchester City Council in England, on the same day as other local elections.

The Conservative Party gained an overall majority on the council, which previously had been under no overall control.

Ward Result

Bishops Waltham

Boarhunt & Southwick

Coldon Common & Twyford

Compton & Otterbourne

Denmead War

Kings Worthy

Littleton & Harestock

Olivers Battery & Badger Farm

Shedfield

St Barnabas

St Bartholomew

St John & All Saints

St Luke

St Michael

St Paul

The Alresfords

Whiteley

Wickham

Wonston & Micheldever

References

2012 English local elections
2012
2010s in Hampshire